The Tomorrow Windows is a BBC Books original novel written by Jonathan Morris and based on the long-running British science fiction television series Doctor Who. It features the Eighth Doctor, Fitz and Trix.

Notes
The novel includes an appearance by London politician Ken Livingstone, who gave permission for Morris to use him as a character.
Other celebrities attending the exhibition at Tate Modern are: Stephen Hawking, Jeremy Paxman, Ian Hislop, Michael Grade, Salman Rushdie, Ricky Gervais, Joanne Rowling, Bill Bailey, Stephen Fry, Richard Curtis and Ben Elton. Some of the unnamed guests are mentioned as recognising Fitz from the novel Sometime Never...

The central plot revolves around windows that allow people to see into their planet's future.

External links
The Cloister Library - The Tomorrow Windows

2004 British novels
2004 science fiction novels
Eighth Doctor Adventures
Novels by Jonathan Morris